The Wanchin Church, officially Wanchin Basilica of the Immaculate Conception, is a Basilica church in Wanjin Village, Wanluan Township, Pingtung County, Taiwan. It's also the first basilica church in Taiwan.

History

Qing Dynasty
The Parish in Wanchin was established by priest Fernando Sainz, who was affiliated with the Dominican Order. The church was originally constructed as a simple mud church in May 1863. On 13 October 1865, the church was heavily destroyed by an earthquake. It was then rebuilt with a bigger size and completed on 8 December 1870 when it was inaugurated.

Republic of China
The church underwent renovation in the 1950s and 1960s by different missionaries. On 20 July 1984, the church was conferred the title of basilica by Pope John Paul II, making it the first church in Taiwan to receive such title. In 1991, the Immaculate Conception Dominican Residence was built on the church ground. In 1994, an activity center was also built within the church area.

On 3 August 2016, the church was vandalized when a mentally ill man set a fire to a wooden statue of the Blessed Virgin Mary inside the building.

Architecture
The current building of the church was built with Spanish fortress architecture.

See also
 List of tourist attractions in Taiwan
 Christianity in Taiwan

References

1863 establishments in Taiwan
Basilica churches in Taiwan
Roman Catholic churches completed in 1863
Religious buildings and structures in Pingtung County